Charles Smyth may refer to:
Charles Smyth (politician) (1693–1784), MP for Limerick
Charles Piazzi Smyth (1819–1900), Scottish astronomer
C. E. Owen Smyth (Charles Edward Owen Smyth, 1851–1925), Irish-born Australian civil servant
Charles Henry Smyth Jr. (1866–1937), American geologist
Charles Gordon Smyth (1883–1927), New Zealand policeman, trade unionist and baker
Charles Phelps Smyth (1895–1990), American chemist
Charles Smyth (priest) (1903–1987), Chinese-born British Anglican priest and Canon of Westminster
Charles Henry Smyth, known as Harry Smyth (1910–1992), Canadian speed skater

See also
Charles Smith (disambiguation)
Smyth (surname)